Macedonio Melloni (11 April 1798 – 11 August 1854) was an Italian physicist, notable for demonstrating that radiant heat has similar physical properties to those of light.

Life
Born at Parma, in 1824 he was appointed professor at the local University but was compelled to escape to France after taking part in the revolution of 1831. In 1839 he went to Naples and was soon appointed director of the Vesuvius Observatory, a post that he held until 1848. In 1845, he was elected a foreign member of the Royal Swedish Academy of Sciences.

He died at Portici, near Naples, of cholera, aged 56.

Work
Melloni's reputation as a physicist rests principally on his discoveries in radiant heat, made with the aid of the thermomultiplier, a combination of thermopile and galvanometer. In 1831, soon after the discovery of thermoelectricity by Thomas Johann Seebeck, he and Leopoldo Nobili employed the instrument in experiments especially concerned with characteristics of (in modern language) black-body radiation transmitted by various materials.

He used an optical bench fitted with thermopiles, shields and light and heat sources, such as Locatelli's lamp and Leslie's cube, in order to show that radiant heat could be reflected, refracted and polarised in the same way as light.

His most important book, La thermocrose au la coloration calorifique (Vol. I., Naples, 1850), was unfinished at his death.

He also studied the magnetism of rocks, electrostatic induction and photography.

Honours
Rumford Medal of the Royal Society (1834);
Correspondent of the Académie des Sciences (1835);
Foreign member of the Royal Society, (1839).

References

1798 births
1854 deaths
People from Parma
Deaths from cholera
19th-century Italian physicists
Foreign Members of the Royal Society
Members of the French Academy of Sciences
Members of the Royal Swedish Academy of Sciences
Recipients of the Pour le Mérite (civil class)
Infectious disease deaths in Campania